Robert Paul Hawkins (12 October 1937 – 26 May 1969) was an Australian motor racing driver. The son of a racing motorcyclist-turned-church minister, Hawkins was a capable single-seater driver but really made his mark as an outstanding sports car competitor driving Ford GT40s and Lola T70s. In 1969 Hawkins was included in the FIA list of graded drivers, an elite group of 27 drivers who by their achievements were rated the best in the world.

Hawkins was hugely popular and known as Hawkeye; the son of a gentleman of the cloth he was a colourful character with a wide colourful vocabulary. He was also famous for being one of two racers to crash into the harbour at the Monaco Grand Prix.

Early racing career
Hawkins began racing in Australia with an Austin-Healey in 1958. He left Australia and arrived in England in 1960. He found employment with the Donald Healey Motor Company Ltd., under John Sprinzel:"I put an ad in the Evening Standard newspaper looking for a mechanic and employed a really good guy to be our works foreman; his name was Paul Hawkins. Paul literally came in straight off the boat from Australia. He’d done a little bit of racing and was a very good mechanic, very good as he knew his stuff, and certainly knew the best parts of the English language, too."

Hawkins was soon behind the wheel of an Austin-Healey Sprite, racing at the Aintree 200 meeting on 30 April 1960, and winning his class in the GT race. He then finished 38th at the 1960 Nürburgring 1000 km race, with co-driver Cyril Simson, known as Team 221, on a "miserable foggy day in May". In 1961 at Le Mans Hawkins teamed with John Colgate in an Austin-Healey Sprite, but they retired in the eighth hour with engine problems. On Whit Monday, 1962, at Crystal Palace Hawkins drove Ian Walker's Lotus-Ford to victory in the up to 1,150 c.c. sports car race, setting lap and race records. At Le Mans in 1965 Hawkins, with John Rhodes, finished twelfth overall, and first in class, in a 1.3-litre Austin-Healey Sebring Sprite entered by the Donald Healey Motor Company, completing 278 laps.

Hawkins also drove single-seaters, participating in the first race run to the new Formula Two regulations at Pau on 5 April 1964, finishing seventh in a pushrod Alexis. He was entered in a Team Alexis Alexis-Cosworth at Silverstone on 20 March 1965 but the race was abandoned due to heavy rain. He went on to win the Formula Two Eifelrennen race on the Nürburgring south circuit, in bad weather, in an Alexis-Cosworth Mk. 7 on 25 April 1965.

Formula One racing

Hawkins participated in three Formula One World Championship Grands Prix, debuting on 1 January 1965 at the South African Grand Prix in a pushrod Ford 1500cc-engined Brabham Formula Two car. Like fellow-Australian Frank Gardner he started with the John Willment Automobiles team. He scored no championship points, as his best finish was ninth on his debut. He did have two podium finishes in the non-championship Rand Grand Prix, held in South Africa. He finished second in 1964 and third in 1965. In 1964 he won the Rhodesian Grand Prix in the Brabham and in 1965 he also won the Cape South Easter Formula One Trophy. He was a non-starter in the 1965 British Grand Prix and retired from the German Grand Prix that year with an oil leak.

He is one of only two Formula One drivers, along with Italian Alberto Ascari, to have crashed into the harbour in Monaco during a Grand Prix. He did so during the 1965 race, when he spun at the chicane after 79 of the 100 laps. He escaped from the crash unhurt: "At this point there was a bit of a furore at the chicane for 
Hawkins struck the wooden barrier at the entry and spun through  the straw bales and over the edge of the quay and into the harbour. 
The Lotus sank to the bottom and the rugged Australian bobbed to the surface and struck out for shore, while boats went to his rescue."

Sports car racing
Hawkins had some considerable success in the World Sports Car Championship. On 14 May 1967, he won the Targa Florio, in Sicily, teamed with Rolf Stommelen, in the factory-entered 8-cylinder Porsche 910. On 23 May 1967, he finished second in the Nürburgring 1000 km in a Porsche 910. He also won the Zeltweg 500 km race on 20 August 1967, in a Ford GT40. On 15 October 1967, at the end of the season Hawkins, paired with Jacky Ickx, won the Paris 1000 km race at Montlhéry in a J.W. Automotive Mirage.

Then on 25 April 1968, he won the Monza 1000 km race with David Hobbs in a Ford GT40, finished second in the Watkins Glen 6-hour, again with Hobbs, and scored thirds at the Nürburgring 1000 km with Jacky Ickx and Zeltweg 500 km races. On 23 November 1968, he won the Cape Town Three Hours solo in a Ferrari P4.

Hawkins was building a business as an owner/operator of racing cars, and in the spring of 1969 he moved his racing shop from North London to Slough. He was killed when his Lola T70 MkIIIB GT crashed and burned at Island Bend during the 1969 RAC Tourist Trophy at Oulton Park.

Contemporary Mike Hailwood gave the following quote in the Daily Mirror article concerning Hawkins' death: "The news of his death horrified me. I can hardly believe that a man as skilful and as experienced as he was should be killed in this way."

Racing record

Complete Formula One World Championship results
(key)

Formula One Non-Championship results
(key)

Complete British Saloon Car Championship results
(key) (Races in bold indicate pole position; races in italics indicate fastest lap.)

† Events with 2 races staged for the different classes.

24 Hours of Le Mans results

Bathurst 500 results

See also

 Austin-Healey Sebring Sprite

References

Notes

Bibliography

External links
 Picture of Paul Hawkins at Aintree in 1960, with Austin-Healey Sprite, X221:

24 Hours of Le Mans drivers
12 Hours of Reims drivers
World Sportscar Championship drivers
Australian Formula One drivers
DW Racing Enterprises Formula One drivers
Racing drivers from Melbourne
Racing drivers who died while racing
Sport deaths in England
1937 births
1969 deaths